was a professional 8 dan Go player.

Biography

Suzuki was a pupil of Iwasaki Kenzo from 1894, and later studied under Honinbo Shuei. In 1909, Suzuki defeated Kensaku Segoe in a series of 6 matches, of which he lost 2, and was promoted to the rank of 4 dan in 1912. Although he joined the Nihon Ki-in when it was founded in 1924, he left to partake in the splinter groups: the Kiseisha and the Keiinsha. In addition, he joined the Hiseikai, a tournament group of five players, with the others being Chiyotaro Onoda, Kensaku Segoe, Dohei Takabe and Karigane Junichi. Suzuki obtained the rank of 8 dan in 1942.

Suzuki's most famous pupil was Minoru Kitani, though others he tutored include Dogen Handa, Goro Suzuki, Riichi Sekiyama, Toshihiro Shimamura and Masaharu Suzuki.

Notes

1883 births
1960 deaths
Japanese Go players